Mogra (or Magra) is a gram panchayat, or village, which is home to the headquarters of the Chinsurah-Mogra community development block in the Chinsurah subdivision of the Hooghly district in the Indian state of West Bengal. It has a station on the Howrah-Bardhaman Main Rail Line, 47 km from Howrah Station and 7 km from Bandel Station.

All India Radio has located some high-powered transmitters in Mogra, which carry a mix of domestic and external services.

Geography

Location
Mogra is located on the outskirts of Hooghly District. Mogra is an hour's drive from Kolkata, the principal commercial, cultural and educational centre of Eastern India. The River Kunti flows through the western side of the town.

The area is composed of flat alluvial plains that form a part of the Gangetic Delta. The high west bank of the tidal Hooghly River is highly industrialised.

Hansghara, Kola, Gajaghanta, Alikhoja, Amodghata, Shankhanagar and Chak Bansberia form a cluster of census towns on the eastern side of Bansberia and includes Mogra and Bara Khejuria (outgrowth).

Police station
The Mogra Police Station has jurisdiction over the Bansberia Municipal area and a part of Chinsurah Mogra CD Block.

Transport
The Grand Trunk Road, which is one of Asia's oldest and longest major roads, passes through Mogra.

Mogra is connected to a variety of destinations via public transport. Hooghly Private Bus Number 4 (Chunchura Court-Memari) and 8 (Chunchura Court-Kalna) run via Mogra. Auto rickshaws and Toto are available for covering short distances. Mogra railway station is situated on Howrah-Bardhaman main line and local trains run from Mogra to Bardhaman and Howrah.

Netaji Subhash Chandra Bose International Airport is approximately an hour's drive.

Education

Schools and Colleges
The majority of schools are Pearl Rosary English Medium School (H.S), Mogra Uttam Chandra High School, the Bagati Ram Gopal Ghosh High School, the Elite Public School, the Narula Public School, the Bimalabala Primary School, S. Saheb Hindi High School, the Pravabati Balika Vidyalaya, the Shib Chandra Girls High School, the Shib Sohagini Junior Basic School, The Tarinisatra High School and Digsui High School.

The Abacus Institute of Engineering and Management and Elite Polytechnic Institute are situated in Mogra. The Academy of Technology engineering college is one station away. Near the Academy of Technology is a rural library. Two government-sponsored rural libraries operate there.

Sreegopal Banerjee College, a general degree college, was established in 1958. The college offers BA (Honours & general), B.Sc. (Honours & general) and B.Com. (Honours & general) courses. It offers honours courses in Bengali, English, Sanskrit, history, philosophy, political science, economics, chemistry, physics, mathematics, botany, zoology and BA (general) and B.Sc. (general) in addition to accountancy honours and B.Com. (general) courses.

Healthcare
Mogra has a rural hospital with more than 35 beds.

People
Mogra has a diverse population. Mogra is home to mostly Bengalis but there is significant population of Biharis and Bangladeshi workers due to jute mills. The oldest groups in the area are Bagdis, Ghosh, Das and Sadhukhan. After the division of Bengal, many refugees settled from Bangladesh. Bagati is a locality inside Mogra and was the ancestral home of the Young Bengal leader Ramgopal Ghosh.

Festivals
Saraswati Puja is conducted annually. The festival is open to everyone and organized by local clubs. There are approximately 50 pujas take place in this area.
The occasion stays for 4 days and this is the main attraction of Mogra.

References

External links
  Satellite map of Sahaganj showing the location of Magra
 Map of Hooghly district

Villages in Hooghly district